Alex Chan may refer to:

Alex Chan (rugby league) (born 1974), New Zealand rugby league player
Alex Chan (politician), former leader of the Citizens Party of Hong Kong
Álex Chan, american handball player

See also
Chan (surname)